Mined may refer to: 

 Mined (text editor), a terminal-based text editor
 Mining, the extraction of valuable geological materials from the Earth

See also
 Mind (disambiguation)
 Mine (disambiguation)